Marauder, in comics, may refer to:

Marauder (2000 AD), a 2000 AD character and series written by Robbie Morrison
Marauder, a DC Comics character and enemy of Aquaman
Marauder, a DC Comics character from Earth-1
Marauder (Marvel Comics), an enemy of Iron Man
Marauders (comics), a Marvel Comics supervillain team
Marauders (comic book), a Marvel Comics comic book launched in 2019

See also
Marauder (disambiguation)

References